Carlos Franco Iribarnegaray (30 August 1912 – 11 December 1982) was a Spanish general who served as Minister of the Air of Spain between 1975 and 1977.

References

1912 births
1982 deaths
Defence ministers of Spain
Government ministers during the Francoist dictatorship